Atrapadas (English: "Trapped"), released as Condemned to Hell, is a 1984 Argentine thriller drama film written and directed by Aníbal Di Salvo and starring Leonor Benedetto, Betiana Blum, Mirta Busnelli and Juan Leyrado. The story is set in a women's prison.

Cast 
 Leonor Benedetto as Silvia
 Betiana Blum as Martina 
 Cristina Murta as La Galíndez 
 Camila Perissé as Susana Nieto 
 Mirta Busnelli as Graciela González (as Mirtha Busnelli) 
 Rita Terranova as Maricarmen 
 Juan Leyrado as Daniel
 Mónica Galán
 Esther Goris 
 Paulino Andrada
 Susana Cart
 Miriam Perazolo
 Elvia Andreoli ... Olga
 Patricia Bermudez
 Clotilde Borella
 Olga Bruno
 Perla Cristal
 Julio Fedel
 Golde Flami
 Inés Murray ... La Judía 
 Carlos Olivieri
 Adriana Parets ... Celadora
 Dorys Perry ... La Rusita
 Gerardo Romano ... Nacho 
 Edgardo Suárez ... El Negro
 Hernán Zabala

External links 
 
 

1984 films
Argentine LGBT-related films
1980s Spanish-language films
1980s thriller drama films
Women in prison films
Argentine thriller drama films
1984 drama films
LGBT-related thriller drama films
1980s Argentine films